Chachro(Urdu:چھاچھرو) is a Tehsil in the Tharparkar District of Sindh, Pakistan.  It is located in the southeast corner of Pakistan, in the Thar Desert, along the Pakistan-India border. It has a population of 351,263.

Geography
Chachro is divided into three areas: Khahor, Kantho and Parkar.  Residents speak the Dhatki language, as well as Sindhi, Urdu and Gujarati.  The majority of the population is Muslim, the Hindu migrated to India after the independence of Pakistan in 1947.

History 
In 1970, Thakur Laxman Singh Sodha, a former deputy minister of Railways in Pakistan and a ruling figure, left for India along with his allies after he was accused of working for Indian intelligence due to his supporting the people of East Pakistan during the Bangladesh genocide. Rajputs and the entire Charan community of Chachro who were in alliance with Laxman Singh, left for India leaving the city of Chachro emptied out. They crossed the then porous Indo-Pak border leading to the Indian state of Rajasthan.

Chachro came under Indian administration after it was captured by the Indian Army in the Chachro Raid during the Indo-Pakistani War of 1971 for eleven months until 22 December 1972. It was handed over to Pakistan after the Shimla Pact of 1972.

References

Tharparkar District